The Euro-Fighter is a type of steel roller coaster developed by Gerstlauer. First launched in 2003, the trademark feature of the roller coaster is its beyond-vertical drop, which reaches an angle greater than 90 degrees. Although the majority of Euro-Fighters are custom designed for each installation, every design so far has included the trademark drop. A number of different track elements are possible, including vertical loops, diving loops and barrel rolls. Almost all Euro-Fighter models have a vertical chain-driven lift hill, although LSM launch systems are also available.

Riders are transported in individual cars around the track, which feature two rows of four seats.  Two exceptions are Huracan at the Belantis amusement park in Germany and Dare Devil Dive at Six Flags Over Georgia, which both feature cars similar to those used on Gerstlauer's launched roller coasters. The cars have over-the-shoulder restraints and may be themed (to an extent) according to the customer's requirements. Dare Devil Dive's cars were the first to use a new lap-bar only restraint system.

Fluch von Novgorod, located at Hansa Park in Germany, was the first Euro-Fighter to incorporate both a vertical lift and an LSM launch in the same circuit.

Installations

References

External links
Gerstlauer official website

Mass-produced roller coasters
Roller coasters manufactured by Gerstlauer